The 2012 IS Open de Tênis was a professional tennis tournament played on clay courts. It was the first edition of the tournament which was part of the 2012 ATP Challenger Tour. It took place in São Paulo, Brazil, on 23–29 April 2012.

ATP entrants

Seeds

 1 Rankings are as of April 16, 2012.

Other entrants
The following players received wildcards into the singles main draw:
  Enrique Bogo
  Tiago Fernandes
  Fernando Romboli
  João Pedro Sorgi

The following players received entry as a special exempt into the singles main draw:
  Ricardo Hocevar

The following players received entry from the qualifying draw:
  Guido Andreozzi
  Alberto Brizzi
  Damir Džumhur
  Leonardo Kirche

The following players received entry as lucky loser:
  Dino Marcan

Withdrawals
The following players withdrew from the main draw:
  Martín Alund

Champions

Singles

  Blaž Kavčič def.  Júlio Silva, 6–3, 7–5

Doubles

  Paul Capdeville /  Marcel Felder def.  André Ghem /  João Pedro Sorgi, 7–5, 6–3

2012 ATP Challenger Tour
2012
2012 in Brazilian tennis